The 2014 Balkan Athletics Indoor Championships was the 19th edition of the annual indoor track and field competition for athletes from the Balkans, organised by Balkan Athletics. It was held on 22 February at the Ataköy Athletics Arena in Istanbul, Turkey.

Results

Men

Women

References

Results
19th BALKAN INDOOR SENIOR CHAMPIONSHIPS Men. Balkan Athletics. Retrieved 2020-02-03.
19th BALKAN INDOOR SENIOR CHAMPIONSHIPS Women. Balkan Athletics. Retrieved 2020-02-03.

External links
Balkan Athletics website

2014
Balkan Athletics Indoor Championships
Balkan Athletics Indoor Championships
Balkan Athletics Indoor Championships
Balkan Athletics Indoor Championships
Balkan Athletics Indoor Championships
International athletics competitions hosted by Turkey
Sports competitions in Istanbul